NTX (Korean: 엔티엑스, formerly known as NT9 and Neo Tracks No.9) is a South Korean boy band formed by Victory Company. The group currently has 9 members: Hyeonjin, Yunhyeok, Jaemin, Changhun, Hojun, Rawhyun, Eunho, Jiseong, and Seungwon. NTX officially debuted on March 30, 2021, with their lead single "Kiss The World" from their debut EP Full of Lovescapes. Originally as ten, Gihyun left the group on November 6, 2022.

History

Predebut
Seongwon was a child model, actor and a former member of the kid group 'USS.O Boy' under the stage name 'U.Win'. Eunho was also a child model.

2020–present: The Opening, debut with Full of Lovescapes
NTX released a series of pre-debut singles to introduce the group named The Opening, starting with The Opening: Public, followed by The Opening: Basic Yell, The Opening: Herma and The Opening: The Finale, the group promoted the lead singles on South Korean music programs.

The group were originally scheduled to debut in January, but due to the aftermath of COVID-19, their debut was postponed. On March 30, 2021, NTX made their official debut with their debut EP Full of Lovescapes, with the title track "Kiss The World".

On April 30, 2021, it was announced that the group would have their first standalone mini concert 'For You', to be held on May 29, 2021.

In September 2021, Jiseong appeared on the survival reality show The Wild Idol as a contestant, he ranking 3rd on the final episode, allowing him to debut in the project boy group TAN.

On November 6, 2022, Victory Company announced that Gihyun has left the group due to personal reasons.

Members
Adapted from their Naver profile.

Active
Hyeongjin (형진) - leader
Yunhyeok (윤혁) - leader
Jaemin (재민) 
Changhun (창훈)
Hojun (호준)
Rawhyun (로현)
Eunho (은호)
Seongwon (승원)

Inactive
Jiseong (지성) – inactive due to group activities with TAN

Former
Gihyun (기현)

Discography

Extended plays

Single albums

Singles

Concerts

Concert Tours
 LIVE TOUR EVENT in JAPAN PART1 - THE BEGINNING (2022)

Standalone Concerts
 For You - NTX Mini Concert (2021)

References

K-pop music groups
Musical groups established in 2020
South Korean boy bands
South Korean dance music groups
South Korean pop music groups
Musical groups from Seoul
2020 establishments in South Korea
Peak Time contestants